Harma is a monotypic butterfly genus in the family Nymphalidae. Its one species is Harma theobene, the angular glider. It is found in Guinea, Sierra Leone, Liberia, Ivory Coast, Ghana, Nigeria, from Cameroon to Angola and in the Democratic Republic of the Congo, Uganda, Kenya, Tanzania, Malawi, Zambia and Mozambique. The habitat consists of forests and heavy woodland.

The larvae possibly feed on Caloncoba gilgiana, Buchnerodendron, Rinorea, Lindackeria (including L. schweinfurthii) and Dovyalis species.

Subspecies
Harma theobene theobene – Guinea, Sierra Leone, Liberia, Ivory Coast, Ghana, Nigeria
Harma theobene blassi (Weymer, 1892) – coast of Kenya, eastern Tanzania
Harma theobene superna (Fox, 1968) – Nigeria: Cross River loop, Cameroon, equatorial Africa, Angola, Democratic Republic of the Congo, Uganda, western Kenya, western Tanzania, Malawi, north-eastern Zambia

References

Butterflies described in 1848
Limenitidinae